Vivid may refer to:

Music
 Vivid (band), a Japanese rock band
 "Vivid" (song), by Electronic, 1999
"ViViD", a 2016 song by Loona from HeeJin

Albums
 Vivid (Vivian Green album), 2015
 Vivid (Crystal Kay album), 2012
 Vivid (Living Colour album), 1988
 Vivid (Ailee album), 2015
 Vivid (KM-MARKIT album), 2005
 Vivid: Kissing You, Sparkling, Joyful Smile, a 2008 mini-album by BoA

Organizations
 Vivid Entertainment, a company that produces and distributes adult media
 Vivid Image, a defunct UK video game developer
 Vivid Imaginations, a UK toy company

Technology
 HTC Vivid, a mobile phone
 Vivid Vervet, the code name for version 15.04 of the Ubuntu Linux distribution

Festivals and arts
 Vivid (arts centre), a media art centre in Birmingham, England
 Vivid Sydney, an outdoor festival in Sydney, Australia
 Vivid Live, a contemporary music festival held by Sydney Opera House in Australia

Other uses
 Vivid, a brand of bleach produced by Reckitt Benckiser
 Vivid, a fictional all-female group in Hatsune Miku: Colorful Stage! that make up one half of Vivid BAD SQUAD
 Magical Girl Lyrical Nanoha ViVid, a 2009 manga in the Magical Girl Lyrical Nanoha series
 HMS Vivid